In mathematics and theoretical physics, a locally compact quantum group is a relatively new C*-algebraic approach toward quantum groups that generalizes the Kac algebra, compact-quantum-group and Hopf-algebra approaches. Earlier attempts at a unifying definition of quantum groups using, for example, multiplicative unitaries have enjoyed some success but have also encountered several technical problems.

One of the main features distinguishing this new approach from its predecessors is the axiomatic existence of left and right invariant weights. This gives a noncommutative analogue of left and right Haar measures on a locally compact Hausdorff group.

Definitions 
Before we can even begin to properly define a locally compact quantum group, we first need to define a number of preliminary concepts and also state a few theorems.

Definition (weight).
  for all , and

Some notation for weights. Let  be a weight on a C*-algebra . We use the following notation:

Types of weights. Let  be a weight on a C*-algebra .
 We say that  is faithful if and only if  for each non-zero .
 We say that  is proper if and only if it is non-zero, lower semi-continuous and densely defined.

Definition (one-parameter group). Let  be a C*-algebra.

Definition (analytic extension of a one-parameter group). For each , let
,
which is a horizontal strip in the complex plane. We call a function  norm-regular if and only if the following conditions hold:
Suppose now that , and let

The function  is uniquely determined (by the theory of complex-analytic functions), so  is well-defined indeed.

Theorem 1.

Definition (K.M.S. weight).
  is invariant under , i.e.,  for all , and
 for every , we have .

Theorem 2.

Theorem 3.

Definition (Locally compact quantum group).
 The co-multiplication is co-associative, i.e., .

From the definition of a locally compact quantum group, it can be shown that the right-invariant K.M.S. weight  is automatically faithful.

Duality 
The category of locally compact quantum groups allows for a dual construction with which one can prove that the bi-dual of a locally compact quantum group is isomorphic to the original one. This result gives a far-reaching generalization of Pontryagin duality for locally compact Hausdorff abelian groups.

Alternative formulations 
The theory has an equivalent formulation in terms of von Neumann algebras.

See also 
 Locally compact space
 Locally compact field
 Locally compact group

References 
Johan Kustermans & Stefaan Vaes. "Locally Compact Quantum Groups." Annales Scientifiques de l’École Normale Supérieure. Vol. 33, No. 6 (2000), pp. 837-934.
 Thomas Timmermann. "An Invitation to Quantum Groups and Duality - From Hopf Algebras to Multiplicative Unitaries and Beyond." EMS Textbooks in Mathematics, European Mathematical Society (2008).

C*-algebras
Functional analysis
Quantum groups
Harmonic analysis
Representation theory